Catherina Paulin (born 3 February 1985) is a Seychellois badminton player. She was part of the national team that won the bronze medals at the 2003 and 2007 All-Africa Games, also settled another bronze medal in the women's singles in 2007. Paulin competed at the 2002 Commonwealth Games in Manchester, England.

Achievements

All-Africa Games 
Women's singles

African Championships 
Women's singles

Women's doubles

IBF International 
Women's singles

References

External links
 

1985 births
Living people
Seychellois female badminton players
Badminton players at the 2002 Commonwealth Games
Commonwealth Games competitors for Seychelles
Competitors at the 2003 All-Africa Games
Competitors at the 2007 All-Africa Games
African Games bronze medalists for Seychelles
African Games medalists in badminton